Thomas Patrick Campbell (born July 12, 1962) is the director and CEO of the Fine Arts Museums of San Francisco, overseeing the de Young and Legion of Honor museums. He served as the director and CEO of the Metropolitan Museum of Art between 2009 and 2017. On 30 June 2017, Campbell stepped down as director and CEO of the Metropolitan Museum of Art under pressure and accepted the Getty Foundation's Rothschild Fellowship for research and study at both the J. Paul Getty Museum in Los Angeles and at Waddesdon Manor, in the UK.

Early life
He was born in Singapore and raised in Cambridge, England, where he attended The Perse School. He earned a BA in English language and literature at New College, Oxford in 1984, followed by a Diploma from Christie's Fine and Decorative Arts course, London, in 1985. While studying for his master's degree at the Courtauld Institute of Art (1987), he discovered how much mainstream art history had overlooked the major role of tapestry in European art and propaganda. During the following years, he worked to rectify this oversight by creating the Franses Tapestry Archive in London (1987–94), which, with more than 120,000 images, is the largest and most up-to-date information resource on European tapestries and figurative textiles in the world. His early research culminated in several research articles and a PhD from the Courtauld Institute of Art, University of London (1999) on the art and culture of King Henry VIII's court.

Career
Tom Campbell has served for more than a decade as Director and CEO of two major US art museums—the Metropolitan Museum of Art from 2009–2017, and the Fine Arts Museums of San Francisco since 2018.

Metropolitan Museum of Art 

Campbell joined the Metropolitan Museum of Art in 1995, where he conceived and organized several acclaimed exhibitions and publications as a curator in the European Sculpture and Decorative Arts department, including Tapestry in the Renaissance: Art and Magnificence (2002), named "Exhibition of the Year" by Apollo Magazine, Tapestry in the Baroque: Threads of Splendor (New York, 2007; Palacio Real, Madrid, spring 2008). “Then after nearly 14 years of widely admired work as a curator and scholar, Campbell was the unexpected choice to succeed Philippe de Montebello.”

During his tenure as director, Campbell was also at the helm for popular and critically acclaimed exhibitions, including: Picasso in the Metropolitan; Alexander McQueen; Bronzino  Drawings; Lost  Kingdoms; Baldessari; Impressionism, Fashion, and Modernity; The  Pictures Generation; Regarding Warhol; The Renaissance Portrait; Kongo; China Through the  Looking Glass; Chinese Ink Art; Pergamon; Unfinished; Jerusalem; Diane Arbus, and Kerry James Marshall.

Campbell led the reconception of the Met’s approach to modern and contemporary art, including the hiring of Sheena Wagstaff to lead a reorganized department, focused on the art of the 20th and 21st century, and launching the Met Breuer in 2016. “The Met Breuer enabled visitors to engage with the art of the twentieth and twenty-first centuries through the global breadth and historical reach of The Met's unparalleled collection and resources through a range of exhibitions, commissions, performances, and artist residencies.”

In 2013, Campbell secured one of the most significant gifts in the history of the Metropolitan Museum of Art, the philanthropist and cosmetics tycoon Leonard A. Lauder’s collection of 78 Cubist paintings, drawings, and sculptures.

As the New York Times said in their announcement of the gift, “scholars say the collection is among the world’s greatest, as good as, if not better than, the renowned Cubist paintings, drawings and sculptures in institutions like the Museum of Modern Art in New York, the State Hermitage Museum in St. Petersburg and the Pompidou Center in Paris. Together they tell the story of a movement that revolutionized Modern art and fill a glaring gap in the Met’s collection, which has been notably weak in early-20th-century art.”

In 2014, the Metropolitan Museum of Art’s Costume Institute reopened to the public following a two-year renovation with the inaugural exhibition Charles James: Beyond Fashion. The costume conservation center also underwent a renovation, including its storage and study facility that houses the bulk of the collection, and the costume reference library. The renovated space now allows the Costume Institute to present exhibitions 10 months out of the year.

2014 also saw the launch of a new interactive feature on the Met’s website and a new iPad app. The website One Met. Many Worlds,  “allows visitors to explore more than 500 highlights from the Museum’s encyclopedic collection in English, Arabic, Chinese, French, German, Italian, Japanese, Korean, Portuguese, Russian, and Spanish.” The website presents individual works of art linked to universal themes and concepts and invites visitors to respond by pairing images playfully, poetically, and creatively. The iPad app, 82nd & Fifth, features curators from across the Museum discussing 100 works of art in the Met’s collection that change the way they see the world – “one work, one curator, two minutes at a time.”

During Campbell’s tenure, the annual Met Iris and B. Gerald Cantor Roof Garden Commission was established. Artists featured included, Huma Bhabha (2017), Adrián Villar Rojas (2016), Cornelia Parker (2016), Pierre Huyghe (2015), and Dan Graham with Günther Vogt (2014).

Under Campbell’s direction, the Met’s attendance rose by more than 50% to a record seven million visitors yearly, “with audiences that are now more diverse than ever before”. Other accomplishments include the renovation of the American Wing, which took place in phases, with the first phase reopening in 2009 and the second phase, which included a new installation of American art spanning the 18th through 20th centuries, in January 2012 and renovating the greatly enlarged and reconceived Islamic Wing, to highlight both the diversity and the interconnectedness of the numerous cultures represented in the collection.

The Fine Arts Museums of San Francisco 

In 2018, it was announced that Campbell would lead the Fine Art Museums in San Francisco. He “arrived in San Francisco in late 2018 with just six months of exhibition programming in place, planning that usually takes years. Needing to arrange something quickly, he was able to land two traveling shows, the Tate Modern’s Soul of a Nation: Art in the Age of Black Power for fall 2019 and a show that had originated at the Frida Kahlo Museum in Mexico as Appearances Can Be Deceiving: The Dresses of Frida Kahlo for spring 2020. But rather than bring them in ‘as is,’ Campbell empowered curators to bring out their Bay Area roots. Soul of a Nation, in particular, embraced the local community. A preview breakfast included not just press but also Black artists who’d made work in the 1960s and ’70s, some of it celebrating fellow Bay Area activists, like Angela Davis and the Black Panthers.”

At the opening for Soul of a Nation, Campbell announced that ‘Free Saturdays’ for San Francisco residents would now extend to all Bay Area residents. This initiative has doubled attendance and brought in a more diverse audience on Saturdays.

In March 2020, in response to the pandemic, Campbell announced that the de Young Museum would host an open-call exhibition for “all Bay Area artists.” Alta magazine called it “an exhibition of immense scale, inherent complexity, and straightforward generosity.” The response to The de Young Open went well beyond the few hundred submissions curators expected. Instead, some 6,000 artists sent in 11,500 works. 877 works were selected and although the museum did not act as an intermediary, all of the works were available for sale. “This exhibition was seen as an ‘unusual take for the director of a major museum, where blockbuster exhibitions of blue-chip international artists—whether contemporary or of the past—have been the financial lifeblood for decades’.”

During Campbell’s tenure the Museums have organized a number of shows, which have been critically well received.

At the Legion of Honor:

In 2021, the Museum presented Wangechi Mutu: I Am Speaking, Are You Listening?. The powerful exhibition was praised for “providing a model for how art institutions can begin the work of decolonizing and reckoning with systemic racism and sexism” and was named one of the best public art displays of 2021 by Artsy.
In April 2022, the Legion of Honor opened Guo Pei: Couture Fantasy, a retrospective of the Chinese fashion designer notably worn by Rihanna on the red carpet at the 2015 Met Gala. The exhibition mines Pei’s career, characterized by her sculptural silhouettes and painstaking craftsmanship, through more than 80 pieces. In August 2022, the Fine Art Museums of San Francisco announced an extension of the exhibition after attracting a record 130,000 visitors in 18 weeks.

At the de Young:

 In 2020, the Museum presented Uncanny Valley, called a top 10 exhibition in 2020 by Frieze magazine, “comprising work by thirteen individual artists and collectives” which warned “against becoming more and more dependent on artificial intelligence technologies we do not fully understand” and alluded to nearby Silicon Valley.
In 2021, the Museum organized artist Hung Liu’s solo show, Golden Gate (金門). An exhibition of Hung Liu’s work was originally meant to be exhibited at the UCCA Center for Contemporary Art in Beijing, it was canceled by the Chinese government a month before it was scheduled to open in December 2019. Officials at the de Young stepped in despite complications due to COVID-19 and other factors, organizing an exhibition that  centered on the immigrant and migrant experience in California.
That same year, Campbell oversaw the organization of Judy Chicago: A Retrospective, the first retrospective of the 82-year old artist. The exhibition spans six decades of the artist’s career and was “expansive and satisfying, leaving the viewer with much to think about.” Also on view in 2021, Uncanny Valley: Being Human in the Age of AI was the “first major exhibition to unpack this question through a lens of contemporary art and propose new ways of thinking about intelligence, nature, and artifice.”

In 2022, “as America marked two years since the murder of George Floyd, Campbell called on the museum sector to ‘confront the colonial narratives we have inherited’” and pledged to update the museums strategic plans for the next several years by evolving the Fine Arts Museums into an anti-racist institution as their top objective. Campbell has focused on five critical areas of improvement: presentation and development of the collections, exhibitions, programs and community, workplace and hiring practices, and the composition and future growth of their board. To that end, the museum announced the appointment of Abram Jackson as director of interpretation. “Jackson will spend much of his time working out how to frame art from the museum collection that may have colonialist roots. He will also, he says, explore how the artistic reappropriation of racist insignia can best be communicated in museum settings.”

FAMSF is actively expanding its collection. The Museums recently acquired works by 30 Bay Area artists, including Wesaam Al-Badry, Rupy C. Tut, Woody D. Othello, and Chelsea Ryoko Wong, with a $1 million grant from the Svane Family Foundation.

Personal life
Campbell is married and lives in San Francisco. He and his wife Phoebe have a son and daughter.

References

External links
 

1962 births
Living people
People from Singapore
People from Cambridge
People educated at The Perse School
Alumni of New College, Oxford
Alumni of the Courtauld Institute of Art
English art historians
English emigrants to the United States
English curators
Directors of the Metropolitan Museum of Art
Fellows of the American Academy of Arts and Sciences
Directors of museums in the United States